The American Hospital Association (AHA) is a health care industry trade group. It includes nearly 5,000 hospitals and health care providers.

The organization, which was founded in Cleveland, Ohio in 1898, with offices in Chicago, Illinois and Washington, D.C. is currently headquartered in Chicago.

They issued a statement in 1964 backing "service to all people" regardless of "race, religion or national origin."

History
In 1870, there were only about 100 general hospitals in the United States, but the institution was growing rapidly. Hospital administrators formed an organization, The Association of Hospital Superintendents of the United States and Canada, which held its first meeting in 1899 in Cleveland, Ohio, where seven of the eight superintendents in attendance were based.

The organization was promoted by publisher Del Sutton, whose journal, The National Hospital Sanitarium Record, was adopted by the group in 1900, gradually coming under control of the organization until it was replaced by the organization's own publication, The Modern Hospital.  Modern Hospital stopped in 1974.

In 1906, the organization adopted its present name. Membership was 450 in 1908. Records of early annual meetings detail some of the conflicts in the emerging hospital culture of Canada and the United States concerning whether hospitals should be governed by physicians or administrators, with non-professionals representing a heavy majority.  Current ongoing research into the cost-effectiveness of such a decision has focused on increasing disparities and conflicts of "business ethics and medical ethics" 
that affect "profitability versus patient and public health care," as administrative overhead makes up a disproportionate amount of health cost.

Activities

Conventions

AHA, "the country's largest hospital group," held their first annual convention in 1898.

Intervention
They've intervened regarding medical costs and hospital earnings:
 showed concern for ability to afford medical care
 lobbied against Medicare for All proposals, and opposed "free care to low-income people who lack medical insurance."
 filed lawsuits to stop the U.S. government from requiring that hospitals make their prices public.
 During the coronavirus pandemic, the AHA, American Medical Association and American Nurses Association asked Congress to provide $100 billion in aid to hospitals for coronavirus testing and treatment.

Professional Membership Groups
Professional Membership Groups (PMGs) are affiliated societies which fall under the umbrella of the AHA:

 American Society for Healthcare Engineering (ASHE)
 American Society for Healthcare Risk Management (ASHRM)
 Association for Community Health Improvement (ACHI)
 Association for the Healthcare Environment (AHE)
 Association for Healthcare Resource & Materials Management (AHRMM)
 At Large AHA Membership for Healthcare Management/Consulting Professionals
 Society for Healthcare Strategy and Market Development (SHSMD)
Institute for Diversity and Health Equity

See also
 The Center for Healthcare Governance
 The New York Foundation
 National Uniform Billing Committee
 Federation of American Hospitals

References

External links

1898 establishments in the United States
Organizations established in 1898
Hospitals in the United States
Health care-related professional associations based in the United States
Business and industry organizations based in Chicago
Human welfare organizations based in Chicago
Professional associations based in the United States